Resi Stiegler (
(born November 14, 1985) is a former World Cup alpine ski racer from the United States. She primarily raced in the technical events and specialized in slalom.

Born and raised in Jackson, Wyoming, Stiegler is the daughter of Olympic champion Josef "Pepi" Stiegler of Austria. She began skiing at age two and racing at six at Jackson Hole.  Junior Olympic and Nor-Am success while still a teenager led to a berth on the U.S. Ski Team; she made her World Cup debut at age 17 in December 2002 at a slalom in Lenzerheide, Switzerland, where she finished a remarkable eleventh. At the 2003 Junior World Championships in France, she won bronze medals in slalom and combined, to which she added a tenth-place finish in combined at the "grown-up" World Championships that year in St. Moritz, Switzerland.

Through March 2016, Stiegler has 21 World Cup top-ten finishes, with one podium. She finished sixth in combined at the 2005 World Championships in Santa Caterina, Italy.  Stiegler  made her Olympic debut at the 2006 Torino games at age 20, placing eleventh in the combined and twelfth in the slalom.

Stiegler's trademark is the tiger ears she usually wears atop her helmet. She won a well-publicized battle with the International Olympic Committee, allowing her to compete with the ears at the Torino Olympics.

After a series of injuries, Stiegler made her first World Cup podium in March 2012, a runner-up finish at a slalom in Ofterschwang, Germany.  It was her first top ten finish in over four years. In a November, 2012 interview, Stiegler had recovered on schedule and was set to compete in the  season as planned.

World Cup results

Season standings

Standings through 4 February 2018

Top tens
 1 podium – (1 SL) 
 23 top tens  – (1 GS, 17 SL, 2 PS, 3 SC)

World Championship results

Olympic results

Video

You Tube – Jackson Hole Dreams – Resi Stiegler

References

External links

Resi Stiegler World Cup standings at the International Ski Federation

U.S. Ski Team – profile – Resi Stiegler
Rossignol.com – alpine skiing – Resi Stiegler
Stiegler Q&A, update on recovery – Stio, clothing sponsor

1985 births
Living people
American people of Austrian descent
American female alpine skiers
Alpine skiers at the 2006 Winter Olympics
Olympic alpine skiers of the United States
Alpine skiers at the 2014 Winter Olympics
Alpine skiers at the 2018 Winter Olympics
Sportspeople from Wyoming
People from Jackson, Wyoming
21st-century American women